Blood, Class, and Nostalgia: Anglo-American Ironies is a 1990 book by Christopher Hitchens which aims to examine the so-called "Special Relationship" between the United States and Great Britain, with a focus especially on the 20th century.

A review by John T. Elson for Time magazine described the book as "rambling [and] opinionated".

It was reissued in 2004 as Blood, Class and Empire: The Enduring Anglo-American Relationship, with a new preface by the author.

Hitchens suggested that the book does not purport to be a history of the relationship; it is rather, a series of "incisions, made at selected crucial points".

Notes

References 
 Hitchens, Christopher. Blood, Class and Empire: The Enduring Anglo-American Relationship. Nation Books, 2004.

1990 non-fiction books
Books by Christopher Hitchens